Amplitude is a measure of a periodic variable in classical physics.

Amplitude may also refer to:

In mathematics and physics
Jacobi amplitude of Jacobi elliptic functions
Probability amplitude, in quantum mechanics
Scattering amplitude, in quantum mechanics
Complex amplitude

Video games 

Amplitude Studios, a video game developer
Amplitude (2003 video game), a 2003 music video game for the PlayStation 2
Amplitude (2016 video game), a 2016 remake of the 2003 video game for the PlayStation 3 and PlayStation 4

Organizations
Amplitude (company), an American public company which provides analytics products

Other uses
Amplitude (political party), a Chilean political party
A term in gymnastics expressing the degree of execution of a gymnastic element
A type of throw in Greco-Roman or freestyle wrestling